Winning the Future: A 21st Century Contract with America is a book by former U.S. Speaker of the House Newt Gingrich that outlines Gingrich's plans for the United States of America. Published in 2005 by Regnery Publishing, its themes include: Social Security reform, immigration reform, education reform, increasing the usage of health savings accounts, allowing the disabled the option of working, and American interests within the world trading system.

The C-SPAN interview show After Words debuted on January 2, 2005; Gingrich was interviewed by Norm Ornstein for the first program, and Winning the Future was the subject of the interview.

References

External links
After Words interview with Gingrich on Winning the Future, January 2, 2005

2005 non-fiction books
Regnery Publishing books
Books by Newt Gingrich